The year 1611 in music involved some significant events.

Events 
January 1 – Oberon, the Faery Prince, a masque written by Ben Jonson and designed by Inigo Jones, is performed at Whitehall Palace; it features music by  Alfonso Ferrabosco the younger and Robert Johnson.
February 3 – Love Freed from Ignorance and Folly, another Jonson/Jones masque, is performed at Whitehall, with music by Ferrabosco.

Publications 
Agostino Agazzari
Psalms and a Magnificat for five voices, Op. 13 (Venice: Ricciardo Amadino)
, Op. 14 (Venice: Ricciardo Amadino), a collection of sacred songs
 for eight voices, Op. 15 (Venice: Ricciardo Amadino)
Giovanni Francesco Anerio
Second book of motets (Rome: Bartolomeo Zannetti)
 (Rome: Bartolomeo Zannetti)
, madrigals for one and two voices (Venice: Angelo Gardano & fratelli)
Robert Ballard – a collection of arrangements for the lute.
Valerio Bona
 (Delightful introits of the mass for two choirs, short, easy, & airy), Op. 18 (Venice: Giacomo Vincenti)
Masses and Vespers for four choirs, Op. 19 (Venice: Giacomo Vincenti)
Bernardino Borlasca – Second book of canzonettas for three voices (Venice: Giacomo Vincenti)
William Byrd – Psalms, Songs, and Sonnets for three, four, five, and six parts (London: Thomas East for William Barley)
Antonio Cifra – 7 Psalms for four voices, Op. 10 (Rome: Giovanni Battista Robletti)
Christoph Demantius –  for six voices (Leipzig: Abraham Lamberg), funeral music to commemorate the death of Christian II, Elector of Saxony on June 23
Christian Erbach – , third book, for four and five voices (Augsburg: Johann Praetorius)
Giacomo Finetti
 for eight voices (Venice: Angelo Gardano & fratelli), Vespers psalms for Corpus Christi
Second book of motets for two voices (Venice: Angelo Gardano & fratelli)
Melchior Franck
 (New Trios) (Nuremberg: David Kauffmann)
 for five, six, and eight voices (Coburg: Justus Hauck), birthday motets
 for four, five, six, and eight voices (Coburg: Justus Hauck), a collection of motets
 for four, five, six, and eight voices (Coburg: Justus Hauck), a collection of quodlibets
 for five voices (Coburg: Justus Hauck), two wedding songs with psalm texts
 for five voices (Coburg: Justus Hauck), a birthday song with text from Isaiah 43
Bartholomäus Gesius
 for five voices (Frankfurt an der Oder: Friedrich Hartmann)
 for eight voices (Frankfurt an der Oder: Friedrich Hartmann), a wedding motet
Carlo Gesualdo
Fifth book of madrigals for five voices (Naples: Giovanni Giacomo Carlino)
Sixth book of madrigals for five voices (Naples: Giovanni Giacomo Carlino)
, for six voices (Naples: Giovanni Giacomo Carlino)
Sigismondo d'India – Second book of madrigals for five voices (Venice: Angelo Gardano & fratelli)
Giovanni Girolamo Kapsberger –  (Rome)
Giovanni Bernardino Nanino – Second book of motets for one, two, three, four, and five voices with organ bass (Rome: Giovanni Battista Robletti)
Jonas Germundi Palma — Een christeligh jula songh... (Stockholm: Christoph Reusner)
Angelo Paoletti –  (Rome: Giovanni Battista Robletti)
Claudio Pari – Il pastor fido, second book of madrigals for five voices (Palermo: Giovanni Battista Maringo)
Parthenia, a collection of keyboard music by John Bull, William Byrd, and Orlando Gibbons
Serafino Patta — Sacra cantica... (Venice: Giacomo Vincenti)

Popular music
 Thomas Ravenscroft – Melismata

Classical music

Opera 
Giulio Cesare Monteverdi –

Births 
June 22 – Pablo Bruna, blind organist and composer (died 1679)
December – Leonora Baroni, singer, instrumentalist and composer (died 1670)
date unknown  – Thomas Brewer, composer who introduced the "glee"

Deaths 
July – Simon Lohet, organist and composer (born c. 1550)
August 20 – Tomás Luis de Victoria, composer (born c. 1548)
date unknown
Livia d'Arco, singer (born c. 1565)
Pierre-Francisque Caroubel, violinist and composer (born 1556)
Johannes Eccard, composer and conductor (born 1553)
Gioseffo Guami, organist, singer and composer (born c. 1540)

References

 
Music
17th century in music
Music by year